Stephen Gareth Young (born May 1955) is a British businessman. He was the chief executive (CEO) of Meggitt plc, a British engineering business specialising in aerospace equipment, from May 2013 to January 2018.

Early life
Young is a chartered management accountant.

Career
Young was finance director of Meggitt from 2004 to 2013, and became CEO in May 2013. In January 2018, he retired and was succeeded by Tony Wood.

Young is a non-executive director of Derwent London.

References

1955 births
Living people
British accountants
British chief executives
British corporate directors